Morristown is an unincorporated community in Wirt County, West Virginia, United States.

References 

Unincorporated communities in West Virginia
Unincorporated communities in Wirt County, West Virginia